L'Assomption was a federal electoral district in Quebec, Canada, that was represented in the House of Commons of Canada from 1867 to 1917.

It was created by the British North America Act, 1867. It was amalgamated into the L'Assomption—Montcalm electoral district in 1914.

Members of Parliament

This riding elected the following Members of Parliament:

Election results

By-election: On Mr. Hurteau being unseated on petition, 24 November 1874

By-election: On Mr. Gauthier being unseated, 3 March 1888

By-election: On election being declared void, 6 February 1892

By-election: On Mr. Laurier's death, 28 December 1906

See also 

 List of Canadian federal electoral districts
 Past Canadian electoral districts

External links
Riding history from the Library of Parliament

Former federal electoral districts of Quebec